Transport 4 is a mix album released by Max Graham in 2001. It was released on Kinetic Records.

Note the name change in the series from Tranceport to Transport.

Track listing

Disc 1
Deep Funk Project - "2 Heavy" (7:29)
Substructure - "Electronik" (7:34)
Boom! - "Boy Versus Girl (Peace Division Dub)" (4:38)
Ben Pound - "Turned" (4:51)
Greed - "Strange World (Blackwatch 'King Monkey Dub')" (5:53)
Sugarglider - "Slow Motion (Van Bellen Remix)" (8:16)
Mad Dogs - "Sudden Journey (Leon Alexander Remix)" (4:51)
Murph - "Dark Sympathy (Planet Heaven Remix)" (3:24)
Vernon - "Vernon's Wonderland (Hybrid's Matrix Dub)" (6:43)
Max Graham - "Tell You" (7:55)
Ogenki Clinic - "First Light" (10:05)

Disc 2
Bladey - "The Nelson Effect (Original Mix)" (6:50)
Blackwatch - "Skin Deep (Gulf Of Tonkin Mix)" (5:51)
 Sonic Infusion - "Reformatted" (5:34)
Max Graham - "Shoreline (Club Mix)" (7:17)
Tata Box Inhibitors - "Freet (Pascal F.E.O.S. Mix)" (4:42)
Timo Maas - "No Trance" (4:58)
Ayumi Hamasaki - "Vogue (Computerhell Vocal Mix)" (6:32)
Hybrid - "High Life (Live Version)" (6:50)
Underworld - "Kittens" (5:58)
Conjure One - "Redemption (Max Graham's Dead Sea Mix)" (9:57)
Private Taste - "First" (6:44)

References

External links

2001 compilation albums
Techno compilation albums
Kinetic Records compilation albums